Andab may refer to:
 Andab-e Jadid
 Andab-e Qadim